Takab Rural District may refer to:
 Takab Rural District (Kerman Province)
 Takab Rural District (Dargaz County), in Razavi Khorasan Province
 Takab Rural District (Kashmar County), in Razavi Khorasan Province